Oxepin is an oxygen-containing heterocycle consisting of a seven-membered ring with three double bonds.  The parent C6H6O exists as an equilibrium mixture with benzene oxide.  The oxepin–benzene oxide equilibrium is affected by the ring substituents.  A related dimethyl derivative exists mainly as the oxepin isomer, an orange liquid.

Oxepin is an intermediate in the oxidation of benzene by the cytochrome P450 (CYP).  Other arene oxides are metabolites of the parent arene.

References